Heritage Victoria is a Victorian State Government agency responsible for administering the Heritage Act 1995 and supporting the work of the Heritage Council of Victoria.

Heritage Victoria was formed from the earlier Historic Buildings Preservation Council, itself It is part of the  Department of Transport, Planning and Local Infrastructure. The Heritage Council is an independent statutory authority, which is also established under the Heritage Act.
Heritage Victoria's main roles are to identify, protect and interpret Victorian cultural heritage resources, particularly those considered to be of State significance. It provides advice on heritage matters to local and State government, industry and the general community.

Heritage Victoria also  maintains the Victorian Heritage Register, and Victorian Heritage Inventory of historical archaeological sites, manages historic shipwrecks and relics. It recommends places on the Heritage Register, administers a permit system for registered places, provides funding for conservation and education.

Heritage Victoria marks some places on the Register with  a Blue plaque.

Heritage Victoria has been criticized in the past either for excessive restrictions on what private owners can do with registered places, or for failing to properly protect Victoria's Heritage, for example in the approval of a multistory tower and partial demolition of the Windsor Hotel. However, it has also won awards for some of its work, such as the mobile phone App for identifying and learning about heritage places. It also maintains a publicly searchable on-line database of places, and database of historical objects and archaeological finds.

See also
 Heritage listed buildings in Melbourne
 :Category:Victorian Heritage Register
 List of heritage registers
 Government of Victoria (Australia)

References

External links
  Heritage Act 1995
 Heritage Victoria website
 Heritage VictoriaFlickr site
 Heritage Place phone app
 Heritage Vic Twitter feed

 
Architecture in Australia
Culture in Victoria (Australia)
1995 establishments in Australia